Newbold is a tram stop on the Oldham and Rochdale Line (ORL) of Greater Manchester's Metrolink network. It opened as part of Phase 3a of the system's expansion, on 28 February 2013.

Services

Newbold is located on the Oldham & Rochdale Line with trams towards Manchester city centre and Rochdale Town Centre. Services are mostly every 12 minutes on all routes.

Connecting bus routes

References

External links
Metrolink stop information
Newbold area map

Tram stops in the Metropolitan Borough of Rochdale
Railway stations in Great Britain opened in 2013
Tram stops on the East Didsbury to Rochdale line